The Butterfly Kid is a science fiction novel by Chester Anderson originally released in 1967. It was nominated for a Hugo Award for Best Novel in 1968. The novel is the first part of the Greenwich Village Trilogy, with Michael Kurland writing the second book (The Unicorn Girl) and the third volume (The Probability Pad) written by T.A. Waters.

Plot introduction
The novel is primarily set in Greenwich Village, and is thoroughly saturated with psychedelic and 1960s counterculture elements. The time is an undefined near future, indicated by SF elements such as video phones and personal hovercraft; the Bicentennial is also mentioned.  The use of psychoactive drugs and their effects are a central element of the story; much of the action revolves around an alien-introduced drug (referred to as "Reality Pills") that cause LSD-like hallucinations to manifest physically, generally causing chaos. The book's protagonist shares a name with the author, and another character shares the name of Michael Kurland, a friend and roommate of the author's at that time.

The book's title refers to a character, Sean, who is able to spontaneously produce butterflies of all shapes, sizes, and colors after taking a "Reality Pill." Although Sean is introduced very early in the story, he is not the novel's central character.

Literary significance & criticism
The book's counterculture subject matter and lighthearted tone have led to it being associated with the New Wave movement in science fiction. Although some reviews state that the novel is "written with wit and elegance," and "an engaging expression of countercultural exuberance," another says it was "already dated" as of 1984.

Release details 
First edition published by Pyramid Books, 1967, 190 pp
First hardcover edition published by Gregg Press, 1977, 
Paperback re-release published by Pocket Books, 1980, 204 pp, 
Paperback reissue by published by Dover Publications, 2019, 208 pp.,

References

1967 science fiction novels
Novels set in New York City
Pyramid Books books
1967 American novels